Thirumalraya Swaminathan was cabinet secretary of India during 1 December 1970 to 2 November 1972. He was a member of Indian Civil Service (ICS). Swaminathan, served as Chief Election Commissioner of India, from 7 February 1973 to 17 June 1977.

External links
 List of former CEC of India

Chief Election Commissioners of India
Tamil civil servants
Cabinet Secretaries of India
Recipients of the Padma Vibhushan in civil service
Indian Civil Service (British India) officers